Roman Edward Ludwiczuk (born 29 August 1957) was a Polish senator, representing Civic Platform.

He was president of Polish Basketball Association (Polski Związek Koszykówki, PZKosz) and club Górnik Wałbrzych.

References

1957 births
Living people
Basketball people in Poland
Members of the Senate of Poland 2005–2007
People from Wałbrzych
Sportspeople from Lower Silesian Voivodeship